State Route 262 (SR 262) is a state highway entirely within the Warm Springs District of Fremont, California. It runs along the  segment of Mission Boulevard between I-880 to the west and I-680 to the east. The route is heavily trafficked, going through a commercial district and containing at least two stop lights.

Route description

SR 262 begins at its western interchange with Interstate 880 in Fremont. SR 262 was built solely to be a link between the two interstates and lies at the point that Interstates 880 and 680 are closest together in the East Bay.  north of SR 262, I-680 abruptly turns to the Northeast and into the Sunol and Livermore Valley thus making SR 262 a vital link between those valleys and the Silicon Valley to the south.

Physically SR 262 begins as a 6 lane road that has been built to freeway standards for its first half mile and after intersecting Kato Road and Warren Avenue with separated grade intersections built in 2008 and 2015, respectively. The remaining half mile is a 4-6 lane city street with two traffic lights at Warm Springs Blvd and Mohave Drive before terminating at a cloverleaf interchange at I-680.

SR 262 is unsigned along its entire route and would be unnoticeable to the public if not for two guide signs placed in the early 2000s on south I-680 that designate the exit as "SR 262 to I-880 Mission Blvd". There is no other signage on I-880 that designates the road by its route number. Signage for the southbound I-680 toll express lane, opened in September 2010, indicates an exit at "262 - Mission Blvd." Locals are largely unaware of the route designation and refer to the road as Mission Blvd exclusively. Street signage of Route 262 appeared in 2018 at Warm Springs Boulevard. In 2021, signage for Route 262 was placed in the westbound (southbound) direction of Mission Boulevard between I-680 and Warm Springs Boulevard. 

SR 262 is part of the National Highway System, a network of highways that are considered essential to the country's economy, defense, and mobility by the Federal Highway Administration.

History
Originally SR 262 was slated to run the route of present-day Oakland Road from San Jose to where present day Warm Springs Blvd and Mission Blvd intersect. This plan was scrapped when State Route 17 (later I-880) was constructed. SR 262 was subsequently routed along its present route.

One planning option was for SR 262 to be deleted from the state route list when State Route 237 to the south was completed between I-880 and I-680.  However, there is no longer room between the developed areas to build 237 into a freeway there.

SR 262 is also a signed section of the Juan Bautista De Anza National Historic Trail.

Major intersections

See also

References

External links

California @ AARoads.com - State Route 262
Caltrans: Route 262 highway conditions
California Highways: SR 262

262
262
State Route 262
Fremont, California